Chris Parr (born 1943) is a British theatre director and television drama producer and executive.

Career
Chris Parr grew up in Littlehampton, Sussex.He was educated at Chichester High School for Boys, where his contemporaries included Howard Brenton, David Wood and the late David Horlock, and Queen's College, Oxford, to which he won an Open Scholarship to read Classics. However, he left Oxford without a degree but with the intention of making a career in the theatre. 
From 1969 to 1972, Parr was the first Fellow in Theatre at the University of Bradford. During this period he worked closely with Bradford University Drama Group, directing or producing new plays by writers, notably Howard Brenton, David Edgar and Richard Crane, who were already getting, or were about to get, attention on a national level. From 1975 to 1981 he was Artistic Director of the Traverse Theatre, where he ran the Royal Court Theatre's Sunday Night Programme and developed and regularly directed plays by new and emerging Scottish playwrights. Writers such as John Byrne and Tom McGrath emerged in this time. 

In 1994, he was appointed head of drama at BBC Birmingham, and in the same year he produced the serial Takin' Over the Asylum, which won a BAFTA award. In 1995 he moved to the BBC's central drama department in London to become Head of Drama Series. By 2002, he had moved to Thames Television as head of drama.

Credits

as Director
Revenge by Howard Brenton (Royal Court Theatre Upstairs, 1969)
Gum and Goo by Howard Brenton, Bradford University Theatre Group, 1969–70
Heads by Howard Brenton, University of Bradford Drama Group, 1969
The Education of Skinny Spew by Howard Brenton, University of Bradford Drama Group, 1969
Triple Bill: Laughs etc, History of a Poor Old Man and The Old Jew (Soho Theatre, 1970)
Two Kinds of Angels (Bradford, 1970)
Inquisition (Soho Theatre, 1971)
A Fart for Europe (Theatre Upstairs, 1973)
True-Life (Soho Theatre, 1973)
New Reekie (Traverse Theatre, 1977)
A&R (Traverse Theatre, 1977)
Rents (Traverse Theatre, 1979)
The Case of David Anderson QC (Traverse Theatre, 1980)
The Long March (BBC Television, 1983)
The Rainbow (BBC Television)
Heartlanders (Birmingham Community Theatre, 1989)
Kings of the Road (Edinburgh Festival, Ambassadors Dublin, Winchester Theatre Royal, Greenwich Theatre, 2003)
The Musical (Edinburgh Festival, 2004)

as Producer
Children of the North (BBC Northern Ireland, 1991)
You, Me & Marley (BBC, 1992)
Martin Chuzzlewit (BBC, 1994)
Takin' Over the Asylum (BBC Scotland, 1994)

as Executive Producer
Preston Front II (BBC, 1995)
The Bill (Thames, 2002)

as Commissioning Editor
Dangerfield (BBC)
Preston Front (BBC)
Backup (BBC)
Dalziel and Pascoe (BBC)
Cruel Train (BBC)

References

Sources
'New Challenge at BBC' Bradford University News and Views, November 1995. Retrieved 3 December 2005.

1944 births
Living people
British theatre directors
British television producers
British television executives
Academics of the University of Bradford